Andreas Joseph Fahrmann (8 November 1742 - 6 February 1802) was a German theologian and cleric. 

Fahrmann was born in Zell am Main near Würzburg, in the Prince-Bishopric of Würzburg. He was ordained as a deacon in 1764 and as a priest in 1765. In 1790, he became auxiliary bishop and titular bishop of Halmiros, now , a position he held until his death in 1802.
One of Fahrmann's known works is a theological review of Karl Friedrich Bahrdt's controversial bible translation.

References

External links 

1742 births
1802 deaths
18th-century German Catholic theologians
People from Würzburg (district)
Academic staff of the University of Würzburg
Canons (priests)
Roman Catholic moral theologians
Place of death missing
Auxiliary bishops
German Roman Catholic titular bishops
Clergy from Würzburg